Brooksella alternata is a species of lobate Cambrian fossil sponge found in the Conasauga Formation of Alabama and Georgia. These fossils are often referred to as "star-cobbles" for their distinct lobate appearance, generally with 6 or more lobes.

Brooksella alternata was first described in 1896 by Charles Walcott, who believed them to be medusoid body fossils of cnidarians.

Later researchers have offered other explanations, from diagenetic gas bubbles to burrow traces. The most accepted identity is that they are hexactinellid sponges, based on observed spicules, ostia, and internal structure.

Another publication offered a new explanation : Brooksella alternata should be pseudofossils.

References

Cambrian animals of North America
Cambrian sponges
Fossil taxa described in 1896